Ubiquitin thioesterase OTUB2 is an enzyme that in humans is encoded by the OTUB2 gene.

Otubains are deubiquitinating cysteine proteases (DUBs; see MIM 602519) that belong to the ovarian tumor (OTU) protein superfamily. Like other DUBs, otubains cleave proteins precisely at the ubiquitin (UB; see MIM 191339)-protein bond.

References

Further reading